James Hamblin (born April 27, 1999) is a Canadian professional ice hockey player currently playing for the Bakersfield Condors in the American Hockey League (AHL) as a prospect to the Edmonton Oilers of the National Hockey League (NHL).

Playing career
Undrafted into the NHL, Hamblin played major junior hockey for the Medicine Hat Tigers, and served as the team's captain from 2017 to 2020. He signed an American Hockey League contract with the Bakersfield Condors in April 2020, then was signed to an NHL contract with the Oilers in March 2022. He played in his first NHL game on November 28, 2022.

Personal
Hamblin was born and raised in Edmonton, and played minor hockey at the South Side Athletic Club before being drafted into the Western Hockey League. He is the son of Tim and Gina Hamblin. His father was a physical education teacher at Leduc Composite High School, just south of Edmonton. His mother, Gina, died of cancer in 2017.

Career statistics

Regular season and playoffs

International

Awards and honours

References

External links

1999 births
Living people
Bakersfield Condors players
Canadian ice hockey forwards
Edmonton Oilers players
Ice hockey people from Edmonton
Medicine Hat Tigers players
Undrafted National Hockey League players